Shaz may refer to:

Personal name
 Shaz Bennett, American writer, filmmaker, performance artist and film programmer.
 Shaz Khan, American Pakistani actor
 Rashid Shaz, Indian Islamic scholar, Writer, Activist and Professor of English
 Matthew Scharenberg,  Australian rules football player
 Shaz, English musician , past member of Aeon Zen
 An alternate spelling of Shez, Israeli poet

Fictional characters
 Shaz Granger, a fictional character in BBC One's Ashes to Ashes
 Shaz Wylie, a character in the television series Bad Girls

Other
 A demon in the grimoire Ars Goetia
 Shaz Turkic, a taxon in some classifications of the Turkic languages

See also
 Shez (disambiguation)